The Indian Government is undertaking several initiatives to upgrade its aging railway infrastructure and enhance its quality of service. The Railway Ministry has announced plans to invest  to upgrade the railways by 2030. Upgrades include 100% electrification of railways, upgrading existing lines with more facilities and higher speeds, expansion of new lines, upgrading railway stations, introducing and eventually developing a large high-speed train network interconnecting major cities in different parts of India and development of various dedicated freight corridors to cut down cargo costs within the country.

Research Design and Standards Organisation (RDSO) is undertaking all research, designs and standardisation work for modernisation, National High Speed Rail Corporation Limited (NHSRCL) is overlooking the implementation of high-speed train programs across the country, Dedicated Freight Corridor Corporation of India (DFCCI) is the agency undertaking development of freight corridors around the country and Indian Railway Stations Development Corporation (IRSDC) is engaged in railway stations upgrade and development programs.

Trains

High-speed rail 

Feasibility studies for five high-speed rail corridors were conducted between 2009 and 2010. A "Diamond Quadrilateral" has been planned to connect Delhi, Mumbai, Kolkata,and Chennai with a high-speed train network. The Indian government conducted joint surveys with a Japanese government team in 2014, finally approving a corridor between Mumbai and Ahmedabad. The new high-speed service will use a Japanese Shinkansen system and rolling stock. India and Japan signed agreements for the project in December 2015; the Japanese government will fund 81% of the total cost with a soft loan fixed at a nominal interest rate. Indian Railways will operate the corridor for a five-year period after its commissioning and afterwards will be turned over to a private operator.

Construction work of the corridor began in 2017 and will be completed by 2028.

Semi-high-speed rail 
A semi-high-speed rail network will be introduced for connecting important routes, including Delhi–Agra, Delhi–Kanpur, Chennai–Hyderabad, Nagpur–Secunderabad, Mumbai–Pune–Solapur–Hyderabad and Mumbai–Goa. Initially, the trains will operate at a maximum speed of 160 km/h, which will be increased to 200 km/h after the rails are strengthened and fenced off. The Gatimaan Express began services on April 5, 2016, after safety clearances were obtained on its first route.

There are also plans by certain states to start semi high speed rail by their own. The 575 km long Silver Line (K-Rail) project of Government of Kerala is one such project.

Conversion to high-speed passenger and freight corridors 
Dedicated freight corridors of 3,300 km length will also be completed thus freeing the dual use high demand trunk routes for running more high-speed passenger trains.

Rolling Stock

Modern locomotive factories
 
In 2015, plans were disclosed for the construction of two locomotive factories with foreign partnerships in the state of Bihar, at Madhepura (electric) and at Marhowra (diesel). The diesel locomotive works will be jointly operated in a partnership with General Electric, which has invested  for its construction and the electric locomotive works with Alstom, which has invested . The factories will provide IR with 800 electric locomotives of 12,000 horsepower and a mix of 1,000 diesel locomotives of 4,500 and 6,000 horsepower each. In November 2015, it was announced IR and GE would engage in an 11-year joint venture in which GE would hold a majority stake of 74%. IR would purchase 100 goods locomotives a year for 10 years, beginning in 2017; the locomotives would be modified versions of the GE Evolution series. The diesel locomotive works will be built by 2018; GE will import the first 100 locomotives and manufacture the remaining 900 in India from 2019 onwards, also assuming responsibility for their maintenance over a 13-year period. In the same month, a  partnership with Alstom to supply 800 electric locomotives from 2018 to 2028 was announced.

Indian Railways is now moving to manufacturing high-end aluminium self-propelled 160 km/hour indigenous Make in India coaches that require no locomotive and are 10% cheaper than the comparable imports. The first such self-propelled train, Vande Bharat Express, was rolled out in October 2018. It is estimated to be 40% cheaper than foreign-built trains. By 2020 an even cheaper and lighter aluminum version is planned to follow.

Railway coach refurbishment
Railway coach refurbishment project aims for the refurbishment of 12 to 15 years old coaches at Carriage Rehabilitation Workshop in Bhopal to enhance passenger amenities and fire safety measures.

Bio-toilets in all trains
In 2014, IR and DRDO developed a bio-toilet to replace direct-discharge toilets, which was the primary type of toilet used in railway coaches. Upgrade of all trains to bio-toilet was completed by the end of fy2018-19 (c. Dec 2017).

The direct discharge of human waste from trains onto the tracks corrodes rails, costing IR tens of millions of rupees a year in rail-replacement work. Flushing a bio-toilet discharges human waste into an underfloor holding tank where anaerobic bacteria remove harmful pathogens and break the waste down into neutral water and methane, which can then be harmlessly discharged onto the tracks. IR plans to completely phase out direct-discharge toilets by 2020 or 2021. All-new coaches were installed in 2016, with older rolling stock to gradually becoming retrofitted. After Comptroller and Auditor General of India found 200,000 complaints related to the foul smelling and blocked bio-toilets, IR announced that it will add 80,000 bio-toilets (each costing INR 1 lakh) in fy2018-2019 and will start installing much improved "vacuum bio-toilets" (each costing INR 2.5 lakh) as well. By Feb 2018, over 100,000 biotoilets have been installed and the project is on target to have 100% biotoilets by 31 March 2019.

Hyperloop

Mumbai–Pune hyperloop
Mumbai–Pune hyperloop is a proposed 1000 km/hr Hyperloop system that will take 14 minutes compared to current 3 hours to commute between these two cities while carrying 10,000 commuters per hour (5,000 in each direction). The route is found feasible and can be made operational by 2026 as per the Detailed Project Report (DPR) submitted to "Pune Metropolitan Region Development Authority" (PMRDA) by "Virgin Hyperloop company" in January 2018. Commuters and cargo will travel in pods traveling in the near-vacuum tubes at the speed of 1,000 km/hr. DPR provided three feasible terminal end-points options in Mumbai, namely Dadar, Santacruz and the international airport. Currently, 300,000 people commute between these two cities daily in 110,000 vehicles (including 80,000 cars and 6,000 buses). (as of Jan 2018)

Infrastructure

Stations

Station redevelopment
Under a INR 1 trillion initiative, 600 railway stations will be redeveloped by monetizing 2700 acres of spare railway land under the  plan undertaken by Indian Railway Stations Development Corporation by converging it with the Atal Mission for Rejuvenation and Urban Transformation and Smart Cities Mission in collaboration with Ministry of Urban Development, Rail Land Development Authority and National Buildings Construction Corporation. 
Following monetization of land,  will be used for the commercial development,  for station redevelopment and the remaining  as surplus with the Railways. Initially A1 and A category stations will be prioritised. To begin with 22 stations will be developed by end of 2018.

In the first batch, IRSDC invited proposals in March 2018 for redeveloping 3 stations over two years, including the Chandigarh railway station, Bijwasan railway station and Anand Vihar railway station costing Rs140 crore, Rs310 crore and Rs206 crore respective.

Tracks

Dedicated freight corridors
There are 2 under implementation and 4 approved DFCs with many more planned. DFC will convert existing and implement new DFC as High-speed rail corridors of India.

Geostrategic border rail lines 

Ministry of Defence (MoD) a list of at least 15 new geostrategic rail lines to be constructed. In 2012, MoD had identified following 14 geostrategic new rail lines to be built near China, Pakistan and Nepal border for the rapid and easier deployment of troops while simultaneously undertaking development of 73 similar geostrategic India-China Border Roads (ICBR) roads as border rail and road transport development in India is lagging much behind China: China has built lines up to Shigatse in Tibet, with plans to connect it to Nepal and further to India. After these lines proposed by MoD in 2013, GoI approved the initial surveys of all 14 lines in 2014, of which at least 12 surveys had been already completed by 2014. Later additional "Bilaspur–Manali–Leh line" was also added to the list of strategic lines.

In 2016, the "Final Location Survey" (FLS) at the cost of INR345 crore for 4 lines to be taken up in the first phase was approved by the Cabinet, funding has been already provided by MoD and railway is undertaking survey of Missamari–Tenga–Tawang, Bilaspur–Manali–Leh, Pasighat–Tezu–Rupai and Lakhimpur–Bame–Silapathar lines. Undulating terrain of young Himalayas and difficult geological conditions affect the pace of survey.

As of July 2020, Cabinet approval for the funding for construction of any of these lines has not been granted yet.

Following projects along the LAC with China are also of relevance, only one of these is included in the MoD's list of strategically important defence projects, however all of these have been declared projects of strategic national importance.

 Char Dham Railway in Uttrakhand
 Dehradun–Uttarkashi–Maneri Gangotri Railway, included in the MoD list, will serve the disputed Nelang-Pulam Sumda area of LAC.
 Uttarkashi–Palar Yamunotri Railway, 22 km long route, will serve disputed Nelang-Pulam Sumda area of LAC.
 Karnaprayag–Saikot–Sonprayag Kedarnath Railway 99 km long route, will serve disputed Nelang-Pulam Sumda and Bara Hoti area of LAC.
 Saikot–Joshimath Badrinath Railway, 75 km long route will serve disputed Nelang-Pulam Sumda and Bara Hoti area of LAC.
 Sivok–Rangpo line (Gangtok) in Sikkim, 44 km long line, will serve disputed area of Doklam on LAC,

Track gauge conversion
 

Indian Railways is converting its entire network to  broad gauge to enhance viability. New and converted broad gauge tracks are being introduced at the rate of 7.7 km per day. IR has projected completion date of the same till 2022.

Track electrification
Dec 2017).

Doubling of tracks
Doubling of tracks to reduce congestion and delays while improving safety. 15,000 km double tracks already exist by 2016 and funding for 12,500 km more track doubling was approved in 2016. In fy2018-19 budget, 18,000 km of broad gauge track doubling and conversion was approved along with 36,000km of track renewal for safety.

Track renewal
In FY 2018-19 budget, 36,000 km of broad gauge renewal was approved to enhance the safety.

Power and fuel

Off-the-grid solar-powered trains
Off-the-grid solar powered trains by installing 1 gigawatt of solar and 130 megawatts of wind power between 2017 and 2022. India introduced world's first solar powered train in June 2017 as well as 50 coaches with rooftop solar farms. In July 2017, IR rolled out its first DEMU train with rooftop solar panels that power the lights, fans and information display systems inside passenger coaches.

Rooftop solar electricity
Rooftop solar electricity at stations to reduce long-term fuel cost and protect the environment.

Traintop solar electricity
In 2017, first train with solar rooftop panels started. Increasingly more trains will be operated with renewal onboard solar electricity generation.

LED lighting
Sustainable LED lighting on all stations by March 2018 to cut electricity costs (Dec 2017).

Safety

Elimination of unmanned level crossings on broad gauge network
Target completion date for this is March 2020. Fy2017-18 has allocated funds to eliminate remaining 4,267 unmanned railway crossings on broad gauge routes in the next two years by March 2020. A  "National Rail Safety Fund," for a complete safety upgrade by 2022, was announced in the 2017 Union Budget; among other improvements, the program would eliminate unmanned level crossings by March 2020. Elimination of Unmanned Level Crossings at an average of 1217 per year by building an average of 1066 Road Over Bridges (ROB) and Road Under Bridges (RUB) per year (May 2016).

Automated fog pilot assistance system 
GPS-enabled Fog Pilot Assistance System railway signalling devices, old practice of putting firecrackers on train tracks to alert train divers was done away with by initially installing 6,095 devices in four most affected zones in 2017, Northern Railway zone, North Central Railway zone, North Eastern Railway zone and North Western Railway zone.

Automated fire alarm system 
Automated fire alarm system project started from 2013 when improved automated fire alarm System in Rajdhani Express trains were installed, these will be installed in the AC coaches of all regular trains.

CCTV camera on stations
963 stations will have CCTV camera by the end of 2018. Progressively CCTV cameras and wifi will be installed on all trains and stations.

CCTV camera inside trains
IR has started to install cameras in some of the trains from fy2017-18 under the Nirbhaya fund. Progressively CCTV cameras will be installed in all trains.

Information technology 

Digital India driven digitalisation of railway to improvement efficiency and reduce cost.  funding was approved in 2016.

Services

Wi-fi-enabled trains and stations

Progressively CCTV cameras and wifi will be installed on all trains and stations (announcement c. March 2018). In September 2015, the IR and Google announced a joint initiative intent on delivering high-speed wi-fi access across 400 major railway stations. The first 100 stations were connected to the network by the end of 2016, with Mumbai Central station the first to be connected.
The Railtel-Google free high-speed public WiFi service is currently available at Mumbai Central, Chennai Central, Chennai Egmore, Madurai Junction, Coimbatore Junction, Chandigarh, Old Delhi, Pune, Bhubaneshwar, Bhopal, Ranchi, Raipur, Vijayawada, Kacheguda, Ernakulum, Thiruvananthapuram, Thrissur, Jabalpur, Vishakhapatnam, Jaipur, Kanpur, Lucknow, Gorakhpur, Patna, Guwahati, Ujjain, Allahabad, Howrah , Varanasi,  etc.

Tickets
Select passengers with confirmed tickets will now be allowed to transfer tickets to someone else. Indian Railway Catering and Tourism Corporation (IRCTC) is now offering a pay-on-delivery option for train tickets on its website and app, where the customers can book their tickets and pay on delivery.

Escalators
Progressively escalators will be installed on all stations with a footfall of more than 25,000 per day.

Station upgrades
600 stations will be upgraded, including 400 to be redeveloped, progressively to enhance services, safety and security.

Social responsibility

Rainwater harvesting
Rainwater harvesting with 1885 rainwater harvesting systems already installed at different locations by December 2016.

Reforestation
Reforestation on the railway land and along the tracks is being undertaken.

See also

 High-speed rail in India
 List of high-speed railway lines in India
 Dedicated freight corridors in India

 Similar roads development
 Bharatmala
 India-China Border Roads, Subsumed in Bharatmala
 Expressways of India
 Setu Bharatam

 Similar ports and river transport development
 Indian Rivers Inter-link
 List of National Waterways in India
 Sagar Mala project

 Similar air transport development
 Indian Human Spaceflight Programme
 UDAN

 General
 Transport in India
 Water transport in India

References

Rail transport in India
Proposed transport infrastructure in India
Proposed infrastructure in India
2020s in India
2020s in rail transport
India